Mapendo Lenganaiso is a women's rights activist in the Democratic Republic of the Congo.

She is head of the Beni branch of the NGO Solidarity of Women's Associations for the Rights of Women and Children (SAFDF), an organization receiving UNHCR support.

References

Year of birth missing (living people)
Living people
Democratic Republic of the Congo women's rights activists
Democratic Republic of the Congo women activists
21st-century Democratic Republic of the Congo people